Alex Schwager is a Swiss orienteering competitor. He received a silver medal in the individual event at the 1964 European Orienteering Championships in Le Brassus.

He also competed at the 1966 World Orienteering Championships, where he placed 16th in the individual contest and fourth in the relay with the Swiss team.

References

Year of birth missing (living people)
Living people
Swiss orienteers
Male orienteers
Foot orienteers